The 31st Ryder Cup Matches were held September 22–24, 1995 at the East Course of Oak Hill Country Club in Pittsford, New York, a suburb southeast of Rochester.

The European team won the competition by a margin of 14 to 13 points to win back the Cup. At the time, this was only Europe's second victory on U.S. soil, the first was eight years earlier in 1987. This was the third consecutive Ryder Cup where Bernard Gallacher captained the European side and the only victory.

Going into the Sunday singles matches, Europe trailed by 2 points, 7 to 9. For the first time, they overcame a deficit entering the singles to win the Cup. The unheralded Irish rookie Philip Walton secured victory for Europe by defeating Jay Haas by one hole. The next Ryder Cup where Europe won from behind was 2012, also held in the U.S.

Format
The Ryder Cup is a match play event, with each match worth one point.  The competition format used in 1995 was as follows:
Day 1 (Friday) — 4 foursome (alternate shot) matches in a morning session and 4 four-ball (better ball) matches in an afternoon session
Day 2 (Saturday) — 4 foursome matches in a morning session and 4 four-ball matches in an afternoon session
Day 3 (Sunday) — 12 singles matches
With a total of 28 points, 14 points were required to win the Cup, and 14 points were required for the defending champion to retain the Cup.  All matches were played to a maximum of 18 holes.

Teams

Captains picks are shown in yellow. The world rankings and records are at the start of the 1995 Ryder Cup.

Two changes were made to the selection process for the European team. For the first time prize money in the three Major Championships played in the USA was included. This change was meant to provide more opportunities for the leading players to gain automatic qualification. The number of captain's picks was, however, reduced from three to two. The qualifying period remained the same, starting with the Canon European Masters in Switzerland at the beginning of September 1994 and ending with the Volvo German Open on August 27, the remaining two team members being chosen soon afterwards by the team captain. In the final event Ian Woosnam had a chance to overtake Philip Walton but a poor last round left him out of the automatic qualifying places. Gallacher announced his picks on August 28. He had already indicated that he would choose Nick Faldo as one of his choices. José María Olazábal was chosen as the second selection. Olazábal had finished in the top 10 in two recent PGA Tour events but had been troubled with a foot injury during the season. Olazábal continued to be troubled with his foot injury and withdrew from the team on September 11. Gallacher immediately chose Ian Woosnam as his replacement.
Olazábal had finished 12th in the points list and had a world ranking of 10 at the time of the Ryder Cup.

Captains picks are shown in yellow. The world rankings and records are at the start of the 1995 Ryder Cup.

Friday's matches

Morning foursomes

Afternoon four-ball

Saturday's matches

Morning foursomes

Afternoon four-ball

Sunday's singles matches

Individual player records
Each entry refers to the win–loss–half record of the player.

Source:

United States

Europe

References

External links
PGA of America: 1995 Ryder Cup
About.com: 1995 Ryder Cup
Sports Illustrated – October 2, 1995
1995 Ryder Cup at BBC Sport

Ryder Cup
Golf in New York (state)
Ryder Cup
Ryder Cup
Ryder Cup
Ryder Cup